Schrebera swietenioides is a flowering plant in the family Oleaceae found in India, Bangladesh, Myanmar, Thailand, Cambodia and Laos. It prefers dry forests. It is commonly known as weaver's beam tree. Other names are mala plasu, muskkakavrksam, maggamaram', manimaram, mushkakavriksham, malamplasu and malamblasu. Flowering season is from February to April.

Description 
Leaves are compound, imparipinnate, opposite, estipulate; rachis 5–10 cm, slender, pubescent flowers are bisexual, yellowish brown, fragrant, 1 cm in size, nocturnal, in terminal, trichotomous cymes. Stigma is shortly bifid. Fruit is a pendulous capsule, 5 x 2.5 cm, obovoid, loculicidally 2 valved. The seeds are winged. Capsule is the size of a hen's egg, and pear shaped.

References

External links 

swietenioides
Oleaceae